Idalus crinis is a moth of the family Erebidae. It was described by Herbert Druce in 1884. It is found in Mexico and Guatemala.

References

 

crinis
Moths described in 1884